The University of Illinois Urbana-Champaign (U of I, Illinois, University of Illinois, or UIUC) is a public land-grant research university in Illinois in the twin cities of Champaign and Urbana. It is the flagship institution of the University of Illinois system and was founded in 1867. Enrolling over 56,000 undergraduate and graduate students, the University of Illinois is one of the largest public universities by enrollment in the country.

The University of Illinois Urbana-Champaign is a member of the Association of American Universities and is classified among "R1: Doctoral Universities – Very high research activity". In fiscal year 2019, research expenditures at Illinois totaled $652 million. The campus library system possesses the fourth-largest university library in the United States by holdings.  The university also hosts the National Center for Supercomputing Applications and is home to the fastest supercomputer on a university campus.

The university contains 16 schools and colleges and offers more than 150 undergraduate and over 100 graduate programs of study. The University of Illinois Urbana-Champaign also operates a Research Park home to innovation centers for over 90 start-up companies and multinational corporations, including Abbott, AbbVie, Caterpillar, Capital One, Dow, State Farm, John Deere, GSI, and Yahoo, among others.

, the alumni, faculty members, or researchers of the university include 30 Nobel laureates, 27 Pulitzer Prize winners, two Fields medalists, and two Turing Award winners. Illinois athletic teams compete in Division I of the NCAA and are collectively known as the Fighting Illini. They are members of the Big Ten Conference and have won the second-most conference titles. Illinois Fighting Illini football won the Rose Bowl Game in 1947, 1952, 1964 and a total of five national championships. Illinois athletes have won 29 medals in Olympic events, ranking it among the top 50 American universities with Olympic medals.

History

Illinois Industrial University

The University of Illinois, originally named "Illinois Industrial University", was one of the 37 universities created under the first Morrill Land-Grant Act, which provided public land for the creation of agricultural and industrial colleges and universities across the United States. Among several cities, Urbana was selected in 1867 as the site for the new school. From the beginning, President John Milton Gregory's desire to establish an institution firmly grounded in the liberal arts tradition was at odds with many state residents and lawmakers who wanted the university to offer classes based solely around "industrial education". The university opened for classes on March 2, 1868, and had two faculty members and 77 students.

The Library, which opened with the school in 1868, started with 1,039 volumes. Subsequently, President Edmund J. James, in a speech to the board of trustees in 1912, proposed to create a research library. It is now one of the world's largest public academic collections. In 1870, the Mumford House was constructed as a model farmhouse for the school's experimental farm. The Mumford House remains the oldest structure on campus. The original University Hall (1871) was the fourth building built; it stood where the Illini Union stands today.

University of Illinois
In 1885, the Illinois Industrial University officially changed its name to the "University of Illinois", reflecting its agricultural, mechanical, and liberal arts curriculum.

During his presidency, Edmund J. James (1904–1920) is credited for building the foundation for the large Chinese international student population on campus. James established ties with China through the Chinese Minister to the United States Wu Ting-Fang. In addition, during James's presidency, class rivalries and Bob Zuppke's winning football teams contributed to campus morale.

Alma Mater, a prominent statue on campus created by alumnus Lorado Taft, was unveiled on June 11, 1929. It was established from donations by the Alumni Fund and the classes of 1923–1929.

The Great Depression slowed construction and expansion on the campus. The university replaced the original university hall with Gregory Hall and the Illini Union. After World War II, the university experienced rapid growth. The enrollment doubled and the academic standing improved.  This period was also marked by large growth in the Graduate College and increased federal support of scientific and technological research. During the 1950s and 1960s the university experienced the turmoil common on many American campuses. Among these were the water fights of the fifties and sixties.

University of Illinois at Urbana-Champaign
By 1967, the University of Illinois system consisted of a main campus in Champaign-Urbana and two Chicago campuses, Chicago Circle (UICC) and Medical Center (UIMC), and people began using "Urbana-Champaign" or the reverse to refer to the main campus specifically. The university name officially changed to the "University of Illinois at Urbana-Champaign" by 1977. While this was a reversal of the commonly used designation for the metropolitan area (Champaign-Urbana), most of the campus is located in Urbana. The name change established a separate identity for the main campus within the University of Illinois system, which today includes campuses in Springfield (UIS) and Chicago (UIC) (formed by the merger of UICC and UIMC).

In 1998, the Hallene Gateway Plaza was dedicated. The Plaza features the original sandstone portal of University Hall, which was originally the fourth building on campus. In recent years, state support has declined from 4.5% of the state's tax appropriations in 1980 to 2.28% in 2011, a nearly 50% decline.  As a result, the university's budget has shifted away from relying on state support with nearly 84% of the budget coming from other sources in 2012.

On March 12, 2015, the Board of Trustees approved the creation of a medical school, the first college created at Urbana-Champaign in 60 years. The Carle Illinois College of Medicine began classes in 2018.

Philanthropy 
Over the last twenty years state funding for the university has fallen. Private philanthropy increasingly supplements revenue from tuition and state funding, providing about 19% of the annual budget in 2012. Notable among significant donors, alumnus entrepreneur Thomas M. Siebel has committed nearly $150 million to the university, including $36 million to build the Thomas M. Siebel Center for Computer Science and $25 million to build the Siebel Center for Design. Further the Grainger Foundation (founded by alumnus W. W. Grainger) has contributed more than $300 million to the university over the last half-century, including donations for the construction of the Grainger Engineering Library. Larry Gies and his wife Beth donated $150 million in 2017 to the shortly thereafter renamed Gies College of Business.

Campus 

The main research and academic facilities are divided almost evenly between the twin cities of Urbana and Champaign, which form part of the Champaign–Urbana metropolitan area. Four main quads compose the center of the university and are arranged from north to south. The Beckman Quadrangle and the John Bardeen Quadrangle occupy the center of the Engineering Campus. Boneyard Creek flows through the John Bardeen Quadrangle, parallel to Green Street. The Beckman Quadrangle, named after Arnold Orville Beckman, is primarily composed of research units and laboratories, and features a large solar calendar consisting of an obelisk and several copper fountains. The Main Quadrangle and South Quadrangle follow immediately after the John Bardeen Quad. The former makes up a large part of the Liberal Arts and Sciences portion of the campus, while the latter comprises many of the buildings of the College of Agriculture, Consumer, and Environmental Sciences (ACES) spread across the campus map.

Additionally, the research fields of the College of ACES stretch south from Urbana and Champaign into Savoy and Champaign County. The university also maintains formal gardens and a conference center in nearby Monticello at Allerton Park.

The campus is known for its landscape and architecture, as well as distinctive landmarks. It was identified as one of 50 college or university "works of art" by T.A. Gaines in his book The Campus as a Work of Art. The campus also has a number of buildings and sites on the U.S. National Register of Historic Places including Harker Hall, Astronomical Observatory, Louise Freer Hall, the Main Library, the Experimental Dairy Farm Historic District, and the Morrow Plots. The University of Illinois Willard Airport is one of the few airports owned by an educational institution.

Sustainability 

In 2008, the University of Illinois Urbana-Champaign became a signatory of the American College and University Presidents’ Climate Commitment, binding the campus to the goal of carbon neutrality as soon as possible. In 2010, the first Illinois Climate Action Plan (iCAP) was written to chart a path to this goal. The iCAP is a strategic framework for meeting the university’s Climate Leadership Commitments to be carbon-neutral by 2050 or sooner and build resilience with its local community. Since then, the iCAP has been rewritten every five years to track the university’s progress.

In December 2013, the University of Illinois launched the Institute for Sustainability, Energy, and Environment (iSEE) on the Urbana-Champaign campus. The institute, under the Vice Chancellor for Research and Innovation, leads an interdisciplinary approach to researching solutions for the world’s most pressing sustainability, energy, and environmental needs. In addition, iSEE has engaged students, faculty, staff, and campus leadership in the iCAP process — especially in the areas of zero waste and conservation of energy, food, water, land, and natural resources — as well as sustainability outreach and immersive educational programs.

In her remarks on being named Director of iSEE in 2022, Professor of Agricultural and Consumer Economics Madhu Khanna explained: “We aim to position campus to play a transformative role in moving us all to a more sustainable future.”

In 2022, new solar and geothermal energy projects, a reduction in water use, and wide-ranging sustainability research helped the University of Illinois Urbana-Champaign earn its fifth consecutive gold certification in the Sustainability Tracking, Assessment & Rating System (STARS). Illinois has consistently achieved gold certification since it began reporting data through STARS in 2013, and the 2022 score was one of its highest to date.

Currently, the campus features 27 LEED certified buildings.

Academics

Admissions

Undergraduate 

The 2015 annual ranking of U.S. News & World Report categorizes the University of Illinois Urbana-Champaign as "more selective." For the Class of 2025 (enrolled Fall 2021), UIUC received 47,593 applications and accepted 28,395 (59.7%). Of those accepted, 8,303 enrolled, a yield rate (the percentage of accepted students who choose to attend the university) of 29.2%. UIUC's freshman retention rate is 93.5%, with 84.9% going on to graduate within six years.

Of the 43% of the incoming freshman class who submitted SAT scores; the middle 50 percent Composite scores were 1340–1510. Of the 24% of enrolled freshmen in 2021 who submitted ACT scores; the middle 50 percent Composite score was between 29 and 34. In the 2020–2021 academic year, 28 freshman students were National Merit Scholars.

Admissions differ greatly between the different colleges in the university. While the overall admit rate is 37.5% (first-choice), the most selective college, the College of Engineering, has an admit rate of 23.2% (for first-choice major). Certain in-demand majors like Computer Science which is known for its Top 5 program in the nation,  can be extremely competitive with an acceptance rate of less than 6.8%, and average freshman ACT composite score of 33.7.

In 2009, an investigation by The Chicago Tribune reported that some applicants "received special consideration" for acceptance between 2005 and 2009, despite having sub-par qualifications. This incident was known was the University of Illinois clout scandal.

Academic divisions

The university offers more than 150 undergraduate and 100 graduate and professional programs in over 15 academic units, among several online specializations such as Digital Marketing and an online MBA program launched in January 2016. In 2015, the university announced its expansion to include an engineering-based medical program, which would be the first new college created in Urbana-Champaign in 60 years. The university also offers undergraduate students the opportunity for graduation honors. University Honors is an academic distinction awarded to the highest achieving students. To earn the distinction, students must have a cumulative grade point average of a 3.5/4.0 within the academic year of their graduation and rank within the top 3% of their graduating class. Their names are inscribed on a Bronze Tablet that hangs in the Main Library.

Online learning
In addition to the university's Illinois Online platform, in 2015 the university entered into a partnership with the Silicon Valley educational technology company Coursera to offer a series of master's degrees and specialization courses, currently including more than 70 joint learning classes. In August 2015, the Master of Business Administration program was launched through the platform. On March 31, 2016, Coursera announced the launch of the Master of Computer Science in Data Science from the University of Illinois Urbana-Champaign. At the time, the university's computer-science graduate program was ranked fifth in the United States by U.S. News & World Report. On March 29, 2017, the University of Illinois Urbana-Champaign launched their Master's in Accounting (iMSA) program, now called the Master of Science in Accountancy (iMSA) program. The iMSA program is led through live sessions, headed by UIUC faculty.

Similar to the university's on-campus admission policies, the online master's degrees offered by The University of Illinois through Coursera also has admission requirements.  All applicants must hold a bachelor's degree, and have earned a 3.0 GPA or higher in the last two years of study. Additionally, all applicants must prove their proficiency in English.

The University of Illinois also offers online courses in partnership with Coursera, such as Marketing in a Digital World, which focuses on how digital tools like internet, smartphone and 3D printers are changing the marketing landscape.

Rankings

In the 2021 U.S. News & World Report "America's Best Colleges" report, UIUC's undergraduate program was ranked tied for 47th among national universities and tied for 15th among public universities, with its undergraduate engineering program ranked tied for 6th in the U.S. among schools whose highest degree is a doctorate.

Washington Monthly ranked UIUC 18th among 389 national universities in the U.S. for 2020, based on its contribution to the public good as measured by social mobility, research, and promoting public service.  Kiplinger's Personal Finance rated Illinois 12th in its 2019 list of 174 Best Values in Public Colleges, which "measures academic quality, cost and financial aid."

The Graduate Program in Urban Planning at the College of Fine and Applied Arts was ranked 3rd nationally by Planetizen in 2015.  The university was also listed as a "Public Ivy" in The Public Ivies: America's Flagship Public Universities (2001) by Howard and Matthew Greene.  The Princeton Review ranked Illinois 1st in its 2016 list of top party schools.

Internationally, UIUC engineering was ranked 13th in the world in 2016 by the Academic Ranking of World Universities (ARWU) and the university 38th in 2019; the university was also ranked 48th globally by the Times Higher Education World University Rankings in 2020 and 75th in the world by the QS World University Rankings for 2020. The Center for World University Rankings (CWUR) has ranked University of Illinois Urbana-Champaign as the 20th best university in the world for 2019–20.

UIUC is also ranked 32nd in the world in Times Higher Education World Reputation Rankings for 2018. Nature Index ranks UIUC 33rd among top Academic institutions in the world.

Research 

The University of Illinois Urbana-Champaign is often regarded as a world-leading magnet for engineering and sciences (both applied and basic).

According to the National Science Foundation, the university spent $625 million on research and development in 2018, ranking it 37th in the nation. It is also listed as one of the Top 25 American Research Universities by The Center for Measuring University Performance. Beside annual influx of grants and sponsored projects, the university manages an extensive modern research infrastructure. The university has been a leader in computer based education and hosted the PLATO project, which was a precursor to the internet and resulted in the development of the plasma display.  Illinois was a 2nd-generation ARPAnet site in 1971 and was the first institution to license the UNIX operating system from Bell Labs.

Research Park 

Located in the southwest part of campus, Research Park opened its first building in 2001 and has grown to encompass 13 buildings. Ninety companies have established roots in research park, employing over 1,400 people. Tenants of the Research Park facilities include prominent Fortune 500 companies Capital One, John Deere, State Farm, Caterpillar, and Yahoo, Inc. Companies also employ about 400 total student interns at any given time throughout the year. The complex is also a center for entrepreneurs, and has over 50 startup companies stationed at its EnterpriseWorks Incubator facility.

In 2011, Urbana, Illinois was named number 11 on Popular Mechanics' "14 Best Startup Cities in America" list, in a large part due to the contributions of Research Park's programs. The park has gained recognition from other notable publications, such as inc.com and Forbes magazine. For the 2011 fiscal year, Research Park produced an economic output of $169.5M for the state of Illinois.

National Center for Supercomputing Applications 

The university hosts the National Center for Supercomputing Applications (NCSA), which created Mosaic, the first graphical web browser, the Apache HTTP server, and NCSA Telnet. The Parallel@Illinois program hosts several programs in parallel computing, including the Universal Parallel Computing Research Center. The university contracted with Cray to build the National Science Foundation-funded supercomputer Blue Waters. The system also has the largest public online storage system in the world with more than 25 petabytes of usable space.  The university celebrated January 12, 1997, as the "birthday" of HAL 9000, the fictional supercomputer from the novel and film 2001: A Space Odyssey; in both works, HAL credits "Urbana, Illinois" as his place of operational origin.

Prairie Research Institute 

The Prairie Research Institute is located on campus and is the home of the Illinois Natural History Survey, Illinois State Geological Survey, Illinois State Water Survey, Illinois Sustainable Technology Center, and the Illinois State Archeological Survey.  Researchers at the Prairie Research Institute are engaged in research in agriculture and forestry, biodiversity and ecosystem health, atmospheric resources, climate and associated natural hazards, cultural resources and history of human settlements, disease and public health, emerging pests, fisheries and wildlife, energy and industrial technology, mineral resources, pollution prevention and mitigation, and water resources. The Illinois Natural History Survey collections include crustaceans, reptiles and amphibians, birds, mammals, algae, fungi, and vascular plants, with the insect collection is among the largest in North America. The Illinois State Geological Survey houses the legislatively mandated Illinois Geological Samples Library, a repository for drill-hole samples in Illinois, as well as paleontological collections. ISAS serves as a repository for a large collection of Illinois archaeological artifacts. One of the major collections is from the Cahokia Mounds.

Technology Entrepreneur Center
The Technology Entrepreneur Center at the University of Illinois Urbana-Champaign is a permanent center established to provide students with resources for their entrepreneurial ideas. The center offers classes, venture and product competitions, and workshops to introduce students to technology innovation and market adoption. 
Events and programs hosted by the TEC include the Cozad New Venture Challenge, Silicon Valley Entrepreneurship Workshop, Illinois I-Corps, and SocialFuse. The campus-wide Cozad New Venture Challenge has been held annually since 2000. Participants are mentored in the phases of venture creation and attend workshops on idea validation, pitching skills, and customer development. In 2019, teams competed for $250,000 in funding. The Silicon Valley Workshop is a week-long workshop, occurring annually in January. Students visit startups and technology companies in the Silicon Valley and network entrepreneurial alumni from the University of Illinois Urbana-Champaign. Students are exposed to technology entrepreneurship, innovation, and leadership. The trip features corporate leaders, venture capitalists, and entrepreneurs in various stages of a startup lifecycle. Illinois I-Corps teaches National Science Foundation grantees how to learn to identify valuable product opportunities that can emerge from academic research, and gain skills in entrepreneurship through training in customer discovery and guidance from established entrepreneurs.
The program is a collaboration between the Technology Entrepreneur Center and EnterpriseWorks, with participation from the Office of Technology Management and IllinoisVentures. The program consists of three workshops over six weeks, where teams work to validate the market size, value propositions, and customer segments of their innovations.
SocialFuse is a recurring pitching and networking event where students can pitch ideas, find teammates, and network.

Center for Plasma-Material Interactions
The Center for Plasma-Material Interactions was established in 2004 by Professor David N. Ruzic to research the complex behavior between ions, electrons, and energetic atoms generated in plasmas and the surfaces of materials. CPMI encompasses fusion plasmas in its research.

Accolades 
In Bill Gates' February 24, 2004, talk as part of his Five Campus Tour (Harvard, MIT, Cornell, Carnegie-Mellon and Illinois) titled "Software Breakthroughs: Solving the Toughest Problems in Computer Science," he mentioned Microsoft hires more graduates from the University of Illinois Urbana-Champaign than from any other university in the world. Alumnus William M. Holt, a senior vice-president of Intel, also mentioned in a campus talk on September 27, 2007, entitled "R&D to Deliver Practical Results: Extending Moore's Law" that Intel hires more PhD graduates from the University of Illinois Urbana-Champaign than from any other university in the country.

In 2007, the university-hosted research Institute for Condensed Matter Theory (ICMT) was launched, with the director Paul Goldbart and the chief scientist Anthony Leggett. ICMT is currently located at the Engineering Science Building on campus.

The University Professional and Continuing Education Association (UPCEA), which recognizes excellence in both individual and institutional achievements, has awarded two awards to U of I.

Discoveries and innovation

Natural sciences 

BCS theory – John Bardeen, in collaboration with Leon Cooper and his doctoral student John Robert Schrieffer, proposed the standard theory of superconductivity known as the BCS theory. They shared the Nobel Prize in Physics 1972 for their discovery.
Sweet corn – John Laughnan produced corn with higher-than-normal levels of sugar while he was a professor at the university.

Computer & applied sciences 

ILLIAC I – Illinois Automatic Computer, a pioneering computer built in 1952 by the University of Illinois, was the first computer built and owned entirely by a US educational institution. Lejaren Hiller, in collaboration with Leonard Issacson, programmed the ILLIAC I computer to generate compositional material for his String Quartet No. 4.
ILLIAC Suite – is a 1957 composition for string quartet which is generally agreed to be the first score composed by an electronic computer.
LLVM – compiler infrastructure project (formerly Low Level Virtual Machine). Vikram Adve and Chris Lattner started development as a research assistant and M.Sc. student.
Mosaic – The first successful consumer web browser was developed at the National Center for Supercomputing Applications at the University of Illinois Urbana-Champaign in 1993.
PLATO – Programmed Logic for Automatic Teaching Operations was the first generalized computer assisted instruction system.  Starting in 1960, it ran on the University of Illinois' ILLIAC I computer.  By the late 1970s, it supported several thousand graphics terminals distributed worldwide, running on nearly a dozen different networked mainframe computers.  Many modern concepts in multi-user computing were developed on PLATO, including forums, message boards, online testing, e-mail, chat rooms, picture languages, instant messaging, remote screen sharing, and multiplayer video games.
Touchscreens and Plasma displays – developed by Donald Bitzer in the 1960s.
Talkomatic is an online chat system that facilitates real-time text communication among a small group of people.  Created by Doug Brown and David R. Woolley in 1973 on the PLATO System.
 Synchronized Sound-on-film – Joseph Tykociński-Tykociner publicly demonstrated for the first time a motion picture with a soundtrack optically recorded directly onto the film June 9, 1922.

Companies & entrepreneurship 
UIUC alumni and faculty have founded numerous companies and organizations, some of which are shown below.

Student life

Student body 
As of spring 2018, the university had 45,813 students. , over 10,000 students were international students, and of them 5,295 were Mainland Chinese. The university also recruits students from over 100 countries among its 32,878 undergraduate students and 10,245 graduate and professional students. The gender breakdown is 55% men, 45% women. UIUC in 2014 enrolled 4,898 students from China, more than any other American university. They comprise the largest group of international students on the campus, followed by South Korea (1,268 in fall 2014) and India (1,167). Graduate enrollment of Chinese students at UIUC has grown from 649 in 2000 to 1,973 in 2014.

Student organizations 

The university has over 1,000 active registered student organizations, showcased at the start of each academic year during Illinois's "Quad Day." Registration and support is provided by the Student Programs & Activities Office, an administrative arm established in pursuit of the larger social, intellectual, and educative goals of the Illini Student Union. The Office's mission is to "enhance ... classroom education," "meet the needs and desires of the campus community," and "prepare students to be contributing and humane citizens." Beyond student organizations, The Daily Illini is a student-run newspaper that has been published for the community of since 1871. The paper is published by Illini Media Company, a not-for-profit which also prints other publications, and operates WPGU 107.1 FM, a student-run commercial radio station. The Varsity Men's Glee Club is an all-male choir at the University of Illinois that was founded in 1886. The Varsity Men's Glee Club is one of the oldest glee clubs in the United States as well as the oldest registered student organization at the University of Illinois. As of 2018, the university also has the largest chapter of Alpha Phi Omega with over 340 active members.

Greek life 

There are 59 fraternities and 38 sororities on campus. Of the approximately 30,366 undergraduates, 3,463 are members of sororities and 3,674 are members of fraternities. The Greek system at the University of Illinois Urbana-Champaign has a system of self-government. While staff advisors and directors manage certain aspects of the Greek community, most of the day-to-day operations of the Greek community are governed by the Interfraternity Council and Panhellenic Council. A smaller minority of fraternities and sororities fall under the jurisdiction of the Black Greek Council and United Greek Council; the Black Greek Council serves "historically black" Greek organizations while the United Greek council comprises other multicultural organizations. Many of the fraternity and sorority houses on campus are on the National Register of Historic Places.

Student government 

U of I has an extensive history of past student governments. Two years after the university opened in 1868, John Milton Gregory and a group of students created a constitution for a student government. Their governance expanded to the entire university in 1873, having a legislative, executive, and judicial branch. For a period of time, this government had the ability to discipline students. In 1883, however, due to a combination of events from Gregory's resignation to student-faculty infighting, the government formally dissolved itself via plebiscite.

It was not until 1934, when the Student Senate, the next university-wide student government, was created. A year before, future U of I Dean of Students, Fred H. Turner and the university's Senate Committee on Student Affairs gave increased power to the Student Council, an organization primarily known for organizing dances. A year after, the Student Council created a constitution and became the Student Senate, under the oversight of the Committee on Student Affairs. This Student Senate would last for 35 years. The Student Senate changed its purpose and name in 1969, when it became the Undergraduate Student Association (UGSA). It no longer was a representational government, instead becoming a collective bargaining agency. It often worked with the Graduate Student Association to work on various projects

In 1967, Bruce A. Morrison and other U of I graduate founded the Graduate Student Association (GSA). GSA would last until 1978, when it merged with the UGSA to form the Champaign-Urbana Student Association (CUSA). CUSA lasted for only two years when it was replaced by the Student Government Association (SGA) in 1980. SGA lasted for 15 years until it became the Illinois Student Government (ISG) in 1995. ISG lasted until 2004.

The current university student government, created in 2004, is the Illinois Student Senate, a combined undergraduate and graduate student senate with 54 voting members. The student senators are elected by college and represent the students in the Urbana-Champaign Senate (which comprises both faculty and students), as well as on a variety of faculty and administrative committees, and are led by an internally elected executive board of a President, External Vice President, Internal Vice President, and Treasurer. , the executive board is supported by an executive staff consisting of a Chief of Staff, Clerk of the Senate, Parliamentarian, Director of Communications, Intern Coordinator, and the Historian of the Senate.

Residence halls 

University housing for undergraduates is provided through 24 residence halls in both Urbana and Champaign. Incoming freshmen are required to live in student housing (campus or certified) their first year on campus. Graduate housing is usually offered through two graduate residence halls, restricted to students who are sophomores or above, and through three university-owned apartment complexes. Some undergraduates choose to move into apartments or the Greek houses after their first year. There are a number of private dormitories around campus, as well as 15 private, certified residences that partner with the university to offer a variety of different housing options, including ones that are cooperatives, single-gender or religiously affiliated. The university is known for being one of the first universities to provide accommodations for students with disabilities. In 2015, the University of Illinois announced that they would be naming its newest residence hall after Carlos Montezuma also known as Wassaja. Wassaja is the first Native American graduate and is believed to be one of the first Native Americans to receive a medical degree.

Libraries and museums 

Among universities in North America, only the collections of Harvard are larger. Currently, the University of Illinois' 20+ departmental libraries and divisions hold more than 24 million items, including more than 12 million print volumes. , it had also the largest "browsable" university library in the United States, with 5 million volumes directly accessible in stacks in a single location. University of Illinois also has the largest public engineering library (Grainger Engineering Library) in the country.  In addition to the main library building, which houses numerous subject-oriented libraries, the Isaac Funk Family Library on the South Quad serves the College of Agriculture, Consumer, and Environmental Sciences and the Grainger Engineering Library Information Center serves the College of Engineering on the John Bardeen Quad.

Residence Hall Library System is one of three in the nation. The Residence Hall Libraries were created in 1948 to serve the educational, recreational, and cultural information needs of first- and second-year undergraduate students residing in the residence halls, and the living-learning communities within the residence halls. The collection also serves University Housing staff as well as the larger campus community. The Rare Book & Manuscript Library (RBML) is one of the Special collections units within the University Library. The RBML is one of the largest special collections repositories in the United States.

The university has several museums, galleries, and archives which include Krannert Art Museum, Sousa Archives and Center for American Music and Spurlock Museum. Gallery and exhibit locations include Krannert Center for the Performing Arts and at the School of Art and Design.

The Illinois Open Publishing Network (IOPN) is hosted and coordinated by the University of Illinois at Urbana-Champaign Library, offering publishing services to members of the University of Illinois at Urbana-Champaign community, to disseminate open access scholarly publications.

Recreation 

The campus has two main recreation facilities, the Activities and Recreation Center (ARC) and the Campus Recreation Center – East (CRCE). Originally known as the Intramural Physical Education Building (IMPE) and opened in 1971, IMPE was renovated in 2006 and reopened in August 2008 as the ARC. The renovations expanded the facility, adding 103,433 square feet to the existing structure and costing $54.9 million. This facility is touted by the university as "one of the country's largest on-campus recreation centers." CRCE was originally known as the Satellite Recreation Center and was opened in 1989. The facility was renovated in 2005 to expand the space and update equipment, officially reopening in March 2005 as CRCE.

Transportation 

The bus system that operates throughout the campus and community is operated by the Champaign-Urbana Mass Transit District. The MTD receives a student-approved transportation fee from the university, which provides unlimited access for university students, faculty, and staff.

Six daily Amtrak trains connect Champaign-Urbana with Chicago and Carbondale (IL).  The City of New Orleans train also serves Memphis, Jackson, Mississippi, and New Orleans.

Willard Airport, opened in 1954 and is named for former University of Illinois president Arthur Cutts Willard. The airport is located in Savoy. Willard Airport is home to University research projects and the university's Institute of Aviation, along with flights from American Airlines.

Athletics 
U of I's Division of Intercollegiate Athletics fields teams for ten men's and eleven women's varsity sports. The university participates in the NCAA's Division I. The university's athletic teams are known as the Fighting Illini. The university operates a number of athletic facilities, including Memorial Stadium for football, the State Farm Center for men's and women's basketball, and the Atkins Tennis Center for men's and women's tennis. The men's NCAA basketball team had a dream run in the 2005 season, with Bruce Weber's Fighting Illini tying the record for most victories in a season. Their run ended 37–2 with a loss to the North Carolina Tar Heels in the national championship game. Illinois is a member of the Big Ten Conference. Notable among a number of songs commonly played and sung at various events such as commencement and convocation, and athletic games are: Illinois Loyalty, the school song; Oskee Wow Wow, the fight song; and Hail to the Orange, the alma mater.
On October 15, 1910, the Illinois football team defeated the University of Chicago Maroons with a score of 3–0 in a game that Illinois claims was the first homecoming game, though several other schools claim to have held the first homecoming as well. On November 10, 2007, the unranked Illinois football team defeated the No. 1 ranked Ohio State football team in Ohio Stadium, the first time that the Illini beat a No. 1 ranked team on the road.

The University of Illinois Ice Arena is home to the university's club college ice hockey team competing at the ACHA Division I level and is also available for recreational use through the Division of Campus Recreation. It was built in 1931 and designed by Chicago architecture firm Holabird and Root, the same firm that designed the University of Illinois Memorial Stadium and Chicago's Soldier Field. It is located on Armory Drive across from the Armory. The structure features four rows of bleacher seating in an elevated balcony that runs the length of the ice rink on either side. These bleachers provide seating for roughly 1,200 fans, with standing room and bench seating available underneath. Because of this set-up the team benches are actually directly underneath the stands.

In 2015, the university began Mandarin Chinese broadcasts of its American football games as a service to its Chinese international students.

Mascot

Chief Illiniwek, also referred to as "The Chief," was from 1926 to 2007 the official symbol of the University of Illinois in university intercollegiate athletic programs. The Chief was typically portrayed by a student dressed in Sioux regalia. Several groups protested that the use of a Native American figure and indigenous customs in such a manner was inappropriate and promoted ethnic stereotypes. In August 2005, the National Collegiate Athletic Association expressed disapproval of the university's use of a "hostile or abusive" image. While initially proposing a consensus approach to the decision about the Chief, the board in 2007 decided that the Chief, its name, image and regalia should be officially retired. Nevertheless, the controversy continues on campus with some students unofficially maintaining the Chief. Complaints continue that indigenous students feel insulted when images of the Chief continue to be present on campus. The effort to resolve the controversy has included the work of a committee, which issued a report of its "critical conversations" that included over 600 participants representing all sides.

Notable alumni and faculty 

Twenty-seven alumni and faculty members of the University of Illinois Urbana-Champaign have won a Pulitzer Prize. , the University of Illinois Urbana-Champaign alumni, faculty, and researchers include 30 Nobel laureates (including 11 alumni). In particular, John Bardeen is the only person to have won two Nobel prizes in physics, having done so in 1956 and 1972 while on faculty at the university. In 2003, two faculty members won Nobel prizes in different disciplines: Paul C. Lauterbur for physiology or medicine, and Anthony Leggett for physics.

The alumni of the university have created companies and products such as Netscape Communications (formerly Mosaic) (Marc Andreessen), AMD (Jerry Sanders), PayPal (Max Levchin), Playboy (Hugh Hefner), National Football League (George Halas), Siebel Systems (Thomas Siebel), Mortal Kombat (Ed Boon), CDW (Michael Krasny), YouTube (Steve Chen and Jawed Karim), THX (Tomlinson Holman), Andreessen Horowitz (Marc Andreessen), Oracle (Larry Ellison and Bob Miner), Lotus (Ray Ozzie), Yelp! (Jeremy Stoppelman and Russel Simmons), Safari (Dave Hyatt), Firefox (Joe Hewitt), W. W. Grainger (William Wallace Grainger), Delta Air Lines (C. E. Woolman), Beckman Instruments (Arnold Beckman), BET (Robert L. Johnson) and Tesla Motors (Martin Eberhard).

Alumni and faculty have invented the LED and the quantum well laser (Nick Holonyak, B.S. 1950, M.S. 1951, Ph.D. 1954), DSL (John Cioffi, B.S. 1978), JavaScript (Brendan Eich, M.S. 1986), the integrated circuit (Jack Kilby, B.S. 1947), the transistor (John Bardeen, faculty, 1951–1991), the pH meter (Arnold Beckman, B.S. 1922, M.S. 1923), MRI (Paul C. Lauterbur), the plasma screen (Donald Bitzer, B.S. 1955, M.S. 1956, Ph.D. 1960), color plasma display (Larry F. Weber, B.S. 1968 M.S. 1971 Ph.D. 1975), the training methodology called PdEI and the coin counter (James P. Liautaud, B.S. 1963), the statistical algorithm called Gibbs sampling in computer vision and the machine learning technique called random forests (Donald Geman, B.A. 1965), and are responsible for the structural design of such buildings as the Willis Tower, the John Hancock Center, and the Burj Khalifa.

Mathematician Richard Hamming, known for the Hamming code and Hamming distance, earned a PhD in mathematics from the university's Mathematics Department in 1942. Primetime Emmy Award-winning engineer Alan Bovik (B.S. 1980, M.S. 1982, Ph.D. 1984) invented neuroscience-based video quality measurement tools that pervade television, social media and home cinema. Structural engineer Fazlur Rahman Khan earned two master's degrees, and a PhD in structural engineering from the university.

Alumni have also led several companies, including BitTorrent (Eric Klinker), Renaissance Technologies (Robert Mercer), Ticketmaster, McDonald's, Goldman Sachs, BP, Kodak, Shell, General Motors, AT&T, and General Electric.

Alumni have founded many organizations, including the Susan G. Komen for the Cure and Project Gutenberg, and have served in a wide variety of government and public interest roles. Rafael Correa, President of The Republic of Ecuador since January 2006 secured his M.S. and PhD degrees from the university's Economics Department in 1999 and 2001 respectively. Nathan C. Ricker attended U of I and in 1873 was the first person to graduate in the United States with a certificate in architecture. Mary L. Page, the first woman to obtain a degree in architecture, also graduated from U of I. Disability rights activist and co-organizer of the 504 Sit-in, Kitty Cone, attended during the 1960s, but left six hours short of her degree to continue her activism in New York.

In sports, baseball pitcher Ken Holtzman was a two-time All Star major leaguer, and threw two no-hitters in his career. In sports entertainment, David Otunga became a two-time WWE Tag Team Champion.

Eta Kappa Nu (HKN) was founded at the University of Illinois Urbana-Champaign as the national honor society for electrical engineering in 1904.  Maurice LeRoy Carr (B.S. 1905) and Edmund B. Wheeler (B.S. 1905) were part of the founding group of ten students and they served as the first and second national presidents of HKN. The Eta Kappa Nu organization is now the international honor society for IEEE as the IEEE-Eta Kappa Nu (IEEE-HKN). The U of I collegiate chapter is known as the Alpha Chapter of HKN. Lowell P. Hager was the head of the Department of Biochemistry from 1969 until 1989 and was elected to the National Academy of Sciences in 1995.

Notes

References

Further reading 
 Hoddeson, Lillian. No Boundaries: University of Illinois Vignettes. (University of Illinois Press, 2004)
 Hoganson, Kristin L.  The Heartland:  An American History (Penguin Random House, 2019) online reviews
 Kanfer, Alaina. Illini Loyalty: The University of Illinois. (University of Illinois Press, 2011)
 Solberg, Winton U. The University of Illinois, 1894–1904: The Shaping of the University. (University of Illinois Press, 2000)

External links 

 
  of University of Illinois Athletics
 
 

 
University
Buildings and structures in Champaign, Illinois
Buildings and structures in Urbana, Illinois
Educational institutions established in 1867
Education in Champaign County, Illinois
Flagship universities in the United States
Forestry education
Land-grant universities and colleges
National Register of Historic Places in Champaign County, Illinois
University of Illinois Urbana-Champaign
Tourist attractions in Champaign County, Illinois
University and college buildings on the National Register of Historic Places in Illinois
Urbana-Champaign
Glassmaking schools